The Circle and M.E.T.E. is a 1983 role-playing game supplement published by Hero Games for Champions.

Contents
The Circle and M.E.T.E. is the first in a series of play aids for Champions, which outline organizations that superhero player characters can interact with.

Reception
William A. Barton reviewed The Circle and M.E.T.E. in The Space Gamer No. 72. Barton commented that "If the succeeding books in the Organization series are as good as this one, Hero Games should have some winners on its hands."

Reviews
 Different Worlds #40 (July/Aug., 1985)

References

Champions (role-playing game) supplements
Role-playing game supplements introduced in 1983